Madathukulam is Border to Dindigul District (Saminathapuram municipality) in Tirupur district in the Indian state of Tamil Nadu.

Demographics
 India census, Madathukulam had a population of 20,212.  Males constitute 51% of the population and females 49%. Madathukulam has an average literacy rate of 70%, higher than the national average of 59.5%: male literacy is 78%, and female literacy is 62%. In Madathukulam, 10% of the population is under 6 years of age.

History 
Madathukulam was part of Coimbatore district. When Tirupur district was formed from the regions of Coimbatore and Erode district, Madathukulam has been a part of Tirupur district. It is also one of the taluks in Tirupur district and a state assembly constituency in Tamil Nadu.

Geography
The Amaravathi River runs through the town.

Government and politics  
C. Mahendran of ADMK is the sitting MLA from Madathukulam (state assembly constituency).

Economy 
The surrounding area is mainly based on agriculture. The area has six paper mills nearby, and one dyeing mill, one tannery, one dairy. Madathukulam is 12 km from Udumalpet, on the way to Palani.

Transport

By Air  
The nearest airport is coimbatore international airport.

By Rail  
By train we can travel to palani,dindigul,madurai,tirunelveli,tiruchendur,udumalaipettai,pollachi,Coimbatore&palakkad.

By Road  

Buses from Palani to Coimbatore Ukkadam Bus Terminal pass via Madathukulam.

Education 
There are Government and privately owned schools in Madathukulam. Those are Government High School and Higher Secondary School (GHSS) near KTL Mill, National Matriculation School, JSR Higher Secondary School, Thiruvalluvar Nursery and Primary School.

Villages
The villages in Madathukulam are Segalinputhur, East Neelambur, Kannadiputhur, Thungavi, Rajavur, Chinnappan Pudur, Polarapatti, Myvadi, Padaiyatchi Pudur, Sengandi Pudur, Goundappa Goundan Pudur and Narasingha Puram.

References 

Cities and towns in Tiruppur district